Saint Vitalis may refer to:

Italian saints
 Saint Vitalis of Milan (1st-2nd century), early Christian martyr 
 Saint Vitalis, martyred in 250 under the persecution of Decius, whose feast date is January 9
 Saints Vitalis and Agricola (died 304), martyr at Bologna with Saint Agricola under Emperor Diocletian
 Saints Vitalis, Sator and Repositus, martyred in Apulia, possibly in the early 4th century
 Saint Vitalis (fl. 499), bishop of Fano
 Saint Vitalis of Assisi (1295–1370), Italian hermit and monk

Other saints
 Saint Vitalis of Gaza (died 625), monk of Gaza
 Saint Vitalis of Salzburg (died 728), second bishop of Salzburg, feast day 20 October, see St. Rupert's Church, Vienna
 Saint Vitalis of Savigny (died 1122), founder of the Savigny Abbey and the Congregation of Savigny

Other uses
 Basilica of San Vitale (Rome)
 Basilica of San Vitale (Ravenna), a church in Ravenna, Italy
 San Vitale (Assisi)
 San Vidal, Venice, a former church

See also  
 Vitale
 Vital (disambiguation)
 Vitalis (disambiguation)
 Saint Vital (disambiguation)